was a Japanese film actor. His nickname was "Arakan." He is famous for playing the role of Kurama Tengu sereies. He entered the film industry in 1927 and came to fame playing Kurama Tengu, a character in the Bakumatsu era created by Jirō Osaragi in his novels. In the 1950s he portrayed the Emperor Meiji in several hit films and appeared in yakuza films in the 1960s. He won Mainichi Film Award for Best Supporting Actor award for his role in The Profound Desire of the Gods.

Filmography 
His filmography includes over 300 films:

 Kurama Tengu (鞍馬天狗, Kurama Tengu) (1928)
 Kurama Tengu: Kyōfu Jidai (鞍馬天狗 恐怖時代, The Frightful Era of Kurama Tengu) (1928)
 Kurama Tengu ōedo ihen (鞍馬天狗 大江戸異変 ) (1950)
Meiji tennō to Nichiro daisensō (明治天皇と日露大戦争) (1957)
Kyōen Kobanzame (侠艶小判鮫, Kyōen Kobanzame) (1958)
Jigoku (1960)
Hana no Shōgai (1963, TV series)
13 Assassins (1963) as Kuranaga
Akō Rōshi (1964, TV series)
Abashiri Prison (網走番外地, Abashiri Bangaichi) (1965)
A Colt Is My Passport (1967) as Shimazu
 The Profound Desire of the Gods (神々の深き欲望, Kamigami no Fukaki Yokubo) (1968)
 Higashi Shinakai (1968)
 Soshiki Bōryoku Kyodai Sakazuki (1969)
 Zatoichi Meets Yojimbo (1970)
 Oshizamurai Kiichihōgan (1973-74)
 The Executioner II: Karate Inferno (1974)
 Tora-san Meets His Lordship (1977)
 Shin Hissatsu Shiokinin (1977 television series) (ep. 11)
 Orenji Rodo kyūkō (1978)
 Nichiren (1979)

References

Bibliography

External links 

  Kinema Junpō Database

Japanese male film actors
1903 births
1980 deaths
Male actors from Kyoto
20th-century Japanese male actors